Argavand (formerly, Uzunoba) is a village in the Armavir Province of Armenia.

See also 
Armavir Province

References 

World Gazeteer: Armenia – World-Gazetteer.com
Report of the results of the 2001 Armenian Census

Populated places in Armavir Province